Callichroma viridipes is a species of beetle in the family Cerambycidae. It was described by Bates in 1879. It is known from Costa Rica, Panama, and Colombia.

References

Callichromatini
Beetles described in 1879